Bishopric Garland or Durham Minstrel, Edited and published by Joseph Ritson, is a revised and corrected edition of a book on County Durham music, published in 1792.

Details 

 Bishopric Garland or Durham Minstrel 1792  (or to give it its full title – "The Bishopric Garland or Durham Minstrel being a choice collection of excellent songs relating to the above county – Full of agreeable Variety, and pleasant Mirth. [Edited by the late Joseph Ritson, Esq.] ---Stockton. Printed by R. Christopher . MDCCLXXXIV ---Licensed and entered according to Order. --- A New Edition, corrected. Newcastle: Printed by Hall and Elliot.  MDCCXCII”) is a book of Geordie folk song consisting of approximately 70 pages with 20 works, published in 1792.

The original edition was published in 1784, this edition appeared in 1792 in a slightly corrected and expanded form, and a further reprint was published in 1809.

Other books in Ritson's Garland series were The Yorkshire Garland, The Northumberland Garland, and The North-Country Chorister. A compilation of the whole series, entitled The Northern Garland was published in 1810.

The “Garland” series were important, not only as important document in their own right, but as one of the main sources of similar successor publications such as John Bell's Rhymes of Northern Bards and Bruce and Stokoe's Northumbrian Minstrelsy.

A set of original documents are held in The Robinson Library of Newcastle University

The publication 
The front cover of the book was as thus :-

THE
BISHOPRIC GARLANDS
OR
DURHAM MINSTREL
BEING A
CHOICE COLLECTION
OF
EXCELLENT SONGS
RELATING TO THE ABOVE COUNTY
Full of agreeable Variety, and pleasant Mirth. 
[EDITED BY THE LATE
JOSEPH RITSON, ESQ.] 
– - – - – - -<br/ >
STOCKTON
PRINTED BY R. CHRISTOPHER. 
MDCCLXXXIV
Licensed and entered according to Order
– - – - – - -<br/ >
A NEW EDITION, CORRECTED. 
NEWCASTLE: 
PRINTED BY HALL AND ELLIOT. 
MDCCXCII

Contents 
are as below :-<br/ >

See also 
Geordie dialect words
Joseph Ritson
Ritson's Northern Garlands 1810<br/ >
Ritson's Yorkshire Garland 1809
Ritson's Northumberland Garland or Newcastle Nightingale 1809
Ritson's North-Country Chorister 1809

References

External links
 Farne archives – front cover
 Allan’s Illustrated Edition of Tyneside songs and readings – page 512
 Google e-book Northern Garland
 Google e-book

English folk songs
Books by Joseph Ritson
Songs related to Newcastle upon Tyne
Northumbrian folklore
Geordie songwriters
1792 songs
Chapbooks